Míčov-Sušice is a municipality in Chrudim District in the Pardubice Region of the Czech Republic. It has about 300 inhabitants.

Administrative parts
The municipality is made up of villages of Jetonice, Míčov, Rudov, Sušice and Zbyslavec.

References

External links

Villages in Chrudim District